Trash Bag Bunch was an environmental-themed toy series produced by Galoob. The toy line consisted of individual, though sometimes paired, figurines, wrapped in water-soluble bags. The specific figure was not initially visible to the buyer; only after dissolving the bag packaging in water would the character inside be revealed. There was also a follow-up toyline, called Trash Bag Bunch II, although the packaging for these figures suggests it may only have been available in Sweden and Denmark.

Story line
The Trash Bag Bunch consisted of two rival factions: a group of humanoids, called 'Disposers', who defended the environment, and a race of alien monsters, called 'Trashors', who created pollution and garbage. Wrapped in alien trash bags, they were tossed off their home planet, Garbigo, by Professor Garbof.

References

External links
Mel Birnkrant's Trash bag Bunch

Toy figurines
Keshi